"Fade into You" is a song by American alternative rock band Mazzy Star from their second studio album, So Tonight That I Might See (1993). The song was written by lyricist Hope Sandoval and composer David Roback, who also served as producer. The song reached number three on the US Billboard Modern Rock Tracks chart in 1994 and is Mazzy Star's only single to appear on the Billboard Hot 100, peaking at number 44. The song also charted at number 48 on the UK Singles Chart and number three in Iceland.

In 2021, Rolling Stone ranked "Fade into You" at number 468 on its list of "The 500 Greatest Songs of All Time". Pitchfork included the song at number 19 on their list of the "Top 200 Tracks of the 90s". Australian alternative music radio station Triple J ranked the song the 32nd greatest of 1994.

Music videos

Two music videos were made for "Fade into You". The first was directed by Kevin Kerslake and premiered on MTV in late October 1993, several weeks after the album's release. The video features the band performing in front of a projection screen depicting white clouds in a black sky, and is interlaced with slow-motion footage of the band in various locales in the Mojave Desert. Portions of this video were filmed at the same location U2 shot the artwork for The Joshua Tree.

The second music video was directed by Merlyn Rosenberg and first aired in February 1994. Known as the Black and White version for its monochromic content throughout, the intentionally grainy, distorted footage shows the band performing in a darkened Burlesque-era ballroom, and is interspersed with footage of Sandoval and Roback at various sites around San Francisco, including the All Seasons Hotel (now the Crescent Hotel) and neighboring Stockton Street tunnel, coupled with genuine footage of the same sites shot in the 1930s. Only the latter music video was broadcast internationally.

Track listings
All songs were written and composed by Hope Sandoval and David Roback except where noted.

 US and Australasian CD single (C2 7243 8 58121 2 5; 88114482)
 "Fade into You" – 4:52
 "I'm Gonna Bake My Biscuit" – 3:37 
 "Under My Car" – 3:35
 "Bells Ring" (acoustic version) – 4:36

 US cassette single (4 km 7243 8 58286 4 5)
 "Fade into You" – 4:52
 "Halah" – 3:12

 UK CD single (CDCL 720)
 "Fade into You"
 "Blue Flower" 
 "I'm Gonna Bake My Biscuit" 

 UK 10-inch vinyl (10CL 720)
 "Fade into You"
 "Five String Serenade" (album version) 
 "Under My Car"
 "Bells Ring" (acoustic version)

 Australian cassette single (8814484)
 "Fade into You" (LP version) – 4:52
 "I'm Gonna Bake My Biscuit"  – 3:37

 US limited-edition in-store play CD (DPRO-79401)
 "Fade into You" (album version)
 "Into Dust" (live from MTV Europe)
 "Ride It On" (live from MTV Europe)
 "Ghost Highway" (live from MTV Europe)
 "Blue Light" (live from MTV Europe)
 "I'm Gonna Bake My Biscuit" 
 "Under My Car"
 "Bells Ring" (acoustic version)
 "Fade into You"

Charts

Weekly charts

Year-end charts

Certifications

Release history

References

1994 singles
1994 songs
Capitol Records singles
Mazzy Star songs
Music videos directed by Kevin Kerslake